The following is a list of telenovelas produced by Radio Caracas Televisión.

1950s

1960s

1970s 
Estefania

1980s

1990s 

Notes

2000s

2010–present 
The following is a telenovela produced by RCTV in aid with other companies from its close in 2007, the company begins to produce projects outside the country independently.

References 

Radio Caracas Televisión telenovelas
 
Radio Caracas Televisión telenovelas